Madureira Esporte Clube, usually abbreviated to Madureira, is a Brazilian football team based in the city of Rio de Janeiro, in the neighbourhood of Madureira. The team compete in Campeonato Carioca, the top tier of the Rio de Janeiro state football league.

History
Madureira was founded on August 8, 1914 as Fidalgo Madureira Atlético Clube. The businessmen Elísio Alves Ferreira, Manoel Lopes da Silva, Manuel Augusto Maia and Joaquim Braia, among others, in 1932, wanted to found a strong club in Madureira neighborhood. They contacted Uassir do Amaral, president of Fidalgo Madureira Atlético Clube at that time. In the same year, they tried to fuse Fidalgo and Magno Futebol Clube, but the partners of Fidalgo did not approve this. After several assemblies, on February 16, 1933, the team was named Madureira Atlético Clube, and the foundation date was determined to be August 8, 1914 (the same foundation date of Fidalgo Madureira Atlético Clube).

Madureira competed in the Federação Metropolitana de Futebol (Metropolitan Football Federation) state championship in 1939, winning the amateur competition and the Torneio Início, which is disputed by professional players.

Madureira Esporte Clube was founded on October 12, 1971, after Madureira Atlético Clube, Madureira Tênis Clube, and Imperial Basquete Clube fused. The foundation date was determined to be, again, August 8, 1914.

Madureira beat Americano 1–0 on March 29, 2006, winning the Taça Rio for the first time, and qualifying to play the Campeonato Estadual do Rio de Janeiro final against Botafogo. In the final, played on April 2, 2006 and on April 9, 2006 the club was defeated in both legs, finishing as the competition runner-up.

In 2013, the club featured Che Guevara's portrait on their shirts to commemorate a tour of the island they made 50 years ago. The goalkeeper’s jersey featured the flag of Cuba.

Achievements
Taça Rio (2nd round of Campeonato Carioca): 2
2006, 2015

Copa Rio: 1
2011

Stadium and real properties

Madureira's home stadium is the Estádio Conselheiro Galvão, which has a maximum capacity of 10,000 people.

30 (thirty) real properties are owned by Madureira. The income generated by these properties are used to pay the club's obligations, like the player's wages.

Current squad

Symbols
The club's colors, blue, purple and yellow, represent, respectively, Fidalgo Madureira Atlético Clube, Madureira Tênis Clube and Imperial Basquete Clube. Madureira's anthem was composed by Lamartine Babo, who also composed the anthems for the big clubs of Rio de Janeiro.

References

External links
 Official Site

 
Association football clubs established in 1914
Football clubs in Rio de Janeiro (state)
Football clubs in Rio de Janeiro (city)
1914 establishments in Brazil